

See also
 Proto-Indo-European noun: Heteroclitic stems